The 1993 International Tennis Championships was an ATP Tour men's tennis tournament held in Coral Springs, Florida in the United States and played on outdoor clay courts. It was the inaugural edition of the tournament and was held from May 10 until May 17, 1993. First-seeded Todd Martin won the singles title.

Finals

 Todd Martin defeated  David Wheaton 6–3, 6–4
 It was Martin's first singles title of his career.

Doubles

 Patrick McEnroe /  Jonathan Stark defeated  Paul Annacone /  Doug Flach 6–4, 6–3

References

External links 
 ITF tournament edition details

International Tennis Championships, 1993
 
International Tennis Championships
International Tennis Championships